Local Courts of Vietnam or People's Courts deal with legal issues at the district precinct levels. These courts report to provincial or municipal governments.

Matters dealt by this court include:

 labour disputes
 individual disputes

Other courts in Vietnam:

 Supreme People's Court of Vietnam
 Provincial Municipal Courts of Vietnam
 Military Courts of Vietnam

External links
Law enforcement in Vietnam
Courts and Tribunals - Vietnam

Judiciary of Vietnam

Municipal courts